Saurita is a genus of moths in the subfamily Arctiinae. The genus was erected by Gottlieb August Wilhelm Herrich-Schäffer in 1855.

Species
The genus includes the following species:

Former species

References

 
Euchromiina
Moth genera